Huseyn Rahmanov (1 December 1902 in Baku – 21 April 1938) was the chairman of the Council of People's Commissars of the Transcaucasian Socialist Federative Soviet Republic from 12 December 1933 to 22 August 1937. He was one of those repressed in the 1930s and during the Great Purge, he was arrested, accused of plotting against the Soviet state, sentenced to death and executed.

See also
Prime Minister of Azerbaijan

References 

Azerbaijani politicians
Politicians from Baku
People from Baku Governorate
Great Purge victims from Azerbaijan
Central Executive Committee of the Soviet Union members
Recipients of the Order of Lenin
1902 births
1938 deaths
Heads of the government of the Azerbaijan Soviet Socialist Republic
Members of the Communist Party of the Soviet Union executed by the Soviet Union